The Women's rhythmic individual ball gymnastic event at the 2015 Pan American Games was held on July 17 and 19 at the Toronto Coliseum. The qualification round was held as part of the individual all around competition on July 17 and the final was held on July 19.

Schedule
All times are Eastern Daylight Time (UTC-4).

Results

Qualification

Final

References

Gymnastics at the 2015 Pan American Games
2015 in women's gymnastics